Iowa Lakes Community College is a community college in Estherville, Iowa, with satellite campuses in Algona, Emmetsburg, Spirit Lake and Spencer, Iowa.  It serves Iowa Community College District III, which encompasses an area roughly contiguous with Clay, Dickinson, Emmet, Kossuth and Palo Alto counties.  The predominantly rural district encompasses and area of approximately 2,900 square miles (7,500 square kilometers) and a population of just over 73,000. Iowa Lakes Community College was officially established in October 1966 by the Iowa Department of Education under provision of Chapters 260C and 260D, Code of Iowa.

Athletics 
Iowa Lakes Community College's athletic teams are nicknamed the Lakers.  Iowa Lakes is a member of the National Junior College Athletic Association and the Iowa Community College Athletic Conference. There are men's teams in baseball, basketball, golf, soccer, sports shooting, swimming and diving, and wrestling, and women's teams in basketball, competitive dance, golf, soccer, softball, sports shooting, swimming and diving, and volleyball. All Laker athletic teams are based out of the Estherville campus except for men's and women's soccer, which is based out of the Spencer campus.

References

External links 

 

Education in Dickinson County, Iowa
Education in Kossuth County, Iowa
Community colleges in Iowa
Education in Clay County, Iowa
Education in Emmet County, Iowa
Education in Palo Alto County, Iowa
NJCAA athletics